Abdeslam Mahmoudi (30 December 1935 – 16 February 2018) was an Algerian professional tennis player.

Mahmoudi played in two Davis Cup ties for Algeria in 1977 and 1978 and won one of his six rubbers.

Two of his sons, Mohammed and Noureddine, followed his steps and also played tennis professionally.

References

2018 deaths
Algerian male tennis players
1935 births
Place of birth missing
Mediterranean Games bronze medalists for Algeria
Competitors at the 1975 Mediterranean Games
Mediterranean Games medalists in tennis
African Games medalists in tennis
African Games bronze medalists for Algeria
Competitors at the 1978 All-Africa Games
21st-century Algerian people